Rejseholdet (international title: Unit One) is a Danish television crime drama series, broadcast on DR1, that ran for four series from 1 October 2000 to 1 January 2004. The series, produced by Danmarks Radio, revolves around an elite mobile police task force that travel around Denmark, assisting each local police force solve serious crimes. The series starred Charlotte Fich as DCI Ingrid Dahl, an ambitious detective who is promoted to the role of unit commander seemingly on the basis of being female. The series co-starred Mads Mikkelsen and Lars Brygmann as Sergeants Allan Fischer and Thomas La Cour.

A total of thirty-two episodes aired across four series. Each episode is titled with a reference to an assistancemelding, which roughly translates into English as "Request for Assistance". Each case portrayed in the show was loosely based upon actual sensational crimes such as murders, kidnappings, cross-border sex trafficking and child pornography.

Production
The series was predominantly filmed at TV-Drama's film studio at TV-byen in Søborg, Denmark, as well as on location. Filming also took place in Sweden, Germany, Iceland and other close regional countries. The format of each episode balances the forensic process and an unfolding backstory that includes the somewhat ambivalent relationships existing between the unit members and their families. The series regularly touches on social issues including the insularity of police work, the social and emotional impact of brutal crime, as well as political and press involvement in the justice process. In 2002, the series received the Emmy Award for Best Drama Series from the International Academy of Television Arts and Sciences. The series also won the Best Drama Award at the annual Danish Television Awards in both 2001 and 2002. For his leading role, Mads Mikkelsen received the Best Actor award at the 2002 Danish Television Awards.

Distribution
The series has been televised in Denmark (DR1), Sweden (TV4), Iceland (Rúv), Germany (ZDF), Australia (SBS), Croatia (HRT3), and the United States (MHz). The complete series is also available on DVD. In the United States and Australia, three individual sets comprising all thirty-two episodes were released on DVD in 2014. These contain purely English subtitles. In Europe, the Scandinavian release, which contains all thirty-two episodes in one box set, includes subtitles in Danish, English, Norwegian and Swedish. In the Netherlands the entire series has been released as "Unit One" with Dutch subtitles. In the United Kingdom, each series was released individually as per the original broadcast. The releases form part of Arrow Films' Nordic Noir strand of releases. The first series was released on 21 January 2013. The second series followed on 27 May 2013. The third series was released on 6 January 2014, followed by the fourth and final series on 7 July 2014.

Cast
 Charlotte Fich as DCI Ingrid Dahl; commander of the unit. Single mother of Tobias (by former husband) and guardian of Gry, the daughter of her late partner. Promoted to a leadership position, she initially struggles to gain the respect of the team and her superior, Ulf Thomson. During the series Ingrid suspect that Ulf is her father. Her suspicion is eventually revealed to be true. 
 Mads Mikkelsen as DS Allan Fischer; the "problem child" of the unit. Impulsive and emotional, Fischer has been frustrated by a lack of advancement, as he is seen by Ulf and Ingrid as "difficult to manage". Despite his rough edges his persistence, physicality and willingness to bend the rules often produces results and he is thus highly valued as a member of the team.
 Lars Brygmann as DS Thomas La Cour; the most cerebral member of the unit. La Cour is noteworthy for his highly intuitive investigative approach that often plays a key role in solving a mystery. Most episodes include a sequence where La Cour seems to mystically "channel" the victim and/or perpetrator in order to re-create the crime event. The portrayal of these moments sometimes suggest the supernatural, such as an episode when an off-duty La Cour leads local police directly to the murder scene and thus places himself under suspicion for the crime.
 Waage Sandø as DI Jens Peter "I.P." Sørensen; the senior member of the unit. I.P. was passed over for promotion when Ingrid was appointed commander. Partner to Kirsten. A world-weary but trusted and quietly supportive second-in-command to Ingrid. Has been with the force for 40 years.
 Erik Wedersøe as Commander Ulf Thomsen; a senior police official, under whom the unit operates. Appointed Ingrid as commander of the unit. The promotion seems at least partially the product of political pressure to elevate a female. Ulf frequently challenges Ingrid's decisions but his respect for her is revealed over time. Ulf's affair with Kirsten and promotion of Ingrid has complicated his longstanding relationship with colleague I.P. 
 Trine Pallesen as DC Gaby Levin; a junior member of the unit. Develops relationship with Johnny Olsen. Gaby is portrayed as the "glue that often holds the unit together", managing unit logistics, and she is heavily relied upon by Ingrid and other unit members. 
 Lars Bom as Johnny Olsen; a contract truck owner/operator. Responsible for moving the Rejseholdet mobile office between locations. Partner of Gaby. Former Danish national football (soccer) star, frequently "unofficially" involved in the unit's police work. 
 Michael Falch as Jan Boysen; a forensic pathologist working with the Danish Police who pursues Ingrid romantically.
 Sebastian Ottensten as Tobias; Ingrid's teenage son. Tobias's brushes with the law (smoking hashish and joyriding in a stolen car) have been used to illustrate Ingrid's conflicted state as an ambitious career officer and a single mother. 
 Lisbet Lundquist as Kirsten Jørgensen, a successful stage actress and I.P.'s partner during the first season. Kirsten struggles with issues pertaining to ageing and alcoholism, and later develops an affair with Ulf. 
 Lykke Sand Michelsen as Gry; daughter of Ingrid's late partner.
 Benedikte Hansen as Trine Dalgaard

Episodes

Series 1 (2000)

Series 2 (2001)

Series 3 (2001-2002)

Series 4 (2002-2003)

Notes

External links
Rejseholdet at DR1
 

Danish crime television series
DR television dramas
Danish drama television series
2000 Danish television series debuts
2004 Danish television series endings
2000s Danish television series
International Emmy Award for Best Drama Series winners
Danish-language television shows